Avellaneda is a city in Gran Buenos Aires, Buenos Aires Province, Argentina.

Avellaneda may also refer to:

Places
Avellaneda Partido, Partido in Gran Buenos Aires, Buenos Aires Province, Argentina
Parque Avellaneda, a barrio of Buenos Aires proper (capital district) and not identical with the provincial department
Avellaneda Park, a park in Parque Avellaneda, Buenos Aires
Avellaneda, Ávila, city in Castile-León, Spain
Avellaneda, Santa Fe Province, Argentina
Avellaneda, Córdoba Province, Argentina

People
Alonso Fernández de Avellaneda,  pseudonym of a 17th-century Spanish writer, author of an unauthorized sequel to Don Quixote
Gertrudis Gómez de Avellaneda, Cuban writer of the 19th century
Marco Avellaneda, mathematician
Mario Avellaneda, Spanish race walker
Nicolás Avellaneda, former president of Argentina

Music
Avellaneda is the title of the second album on the label Rune Grammofon by the Danish electronica group Skyphone. The title is related to Alonso Fernández de Avellaneda

See also
Avellaneda Department (disambiguation)